Messianic Judaism is a religious movement that arose in the 1960s and 1970s. Its members declared themselves as followers of Judaism and believers in Yeshua (Jesus). Messianic Judaism is not accepted as a valid form of Judaism by most Jewish communities, who have declared it as a form of Christianity.

Associations of congregations

References

Messianic Jew
Messianic Judaism